David Qajaakuttuk Qamaniq is a Canadian politician, who was elected to represent the district of Tununiq in the Legislative Assembly of Nunavut in a by-election on September 16, 2019. Prior to his election to the legislature, he was a mayor of Pond Inlet; he ran in the same district in a 2011 by-election, the 2013 Nunavut general election and the 2017 Nunavut general election, losing each time to Joe Enook, and was elected in the by-election following Enook's death in office.

He was a stage actor in his youth, who toured with the Tunooniq Theatre company to perform in Inuit stage plays. He was most noted for his performance in David Holman's 1993 play Whale, for which he received a Dora Mavor Moore Award nomination for Outstanding Performance by a Male in a Principal Role – Play (Large Theatre).

Qamaniq filed a wrongful death suit against the Royal Canadian Mounted Police in April 2019, following the possibly racially-motivated shooting death of his son Kunuk in 2017. He did not base his electoral campaign on the lawsuit, however, instead highlighting basic economic and community improvement proposals such as the construction of a new airstrip to serve the community, and the need for infrastructure facilities such as an indoor swimming pool, a playground, and a community hall.

References

1961 births
Members of the Legislative Assembly of Nunavut
Canadian male stage actors
Inuit from Nunavut
Inuit politicians
Inuit male actors
21st-century Canadian politicians
20th-century Canadian male actors
Mayors of places in Nunavut
Actors from Nunavut
Canadian actor-politicians
Living people